The 1999 Nigerian Senate election in Ogun State was held on February 20, 1999, to elect members of the Nigerian Senate to represent Ogun State. Afolabi Olabimtan representing Ogun West, Femi Okurounmu representing Ogun Central and Olabiyi Durojaiye representing Ogun East all won on the platform of the Alliance for Democracy.

Overview

Summary

Results

Ogun West 
The election was won by Afolabi Olabimtan of the Alliance for Democracy.

Ogun Central 
The election was won by Femi Okurounmu of the Alliance for Democracy.

Ogun East 
The election was won by Olabiyi Durojaiye of the Alliance for Democracy.

References 

Ogu
Ogu
Ogun State Senate elections